Galina Vladimirovna Chugunova (née  Poryvaeva ); born February 22, 1980, in Kaluga) is a Russian sprint canoer who competed in the late 1990s and early 2000s. She won a silver medal in the K-4 200 m event at the 1999 ICF Canoe Sprint World Championships in Milan.

Poryvayeva also finished seventh in the K-4 500 m event at the 2000 Summer Olympics in Sydney.

She is currently working coaches in Kaluga Sports school Typhoon.

References

External links
 
 
 

1980 births
Canoeists at the 2000 Summer Olympics
Living people
Olympic canoeists of Russia
Russian female canoeists
ICF Canoe Sprint World Championships medalists in kayak
Sportspeople from Kaluga